Oftershausen is a village in the district of Kreuzlingen in the canton of Thurgau, Switzerland.

It was first recorded in 1275 as Oftershusen.

Oftershausen is located in the former municipality Dippishausen-Oftershausen. In 1984 Dippishausen-Oftershausen municipality was incorporated into its neighboring municipality Siegershausen, which in turn merged with its neighbors in 1996 to form a new and larger municipality Kemmental.

Oftershausen was also the name of the municipality Dippishausen-Oftershausen before 1900.

References

Villages in Switzerland
States and territories established in 1275